Andrey Ramos do Nascimento (born 15 February 1998) is a Brazilian footballer who plays as a centre midfielder for Coritiba.

Club Career
Andrey made his professional debut for Vasco da Gama at 18 in a 2016 Serie B game against Luverdense, coming on as a halftime substitute for Caio Monteiro, he would eventually solidify himself in the first team making 27 appearances in the 2018 Season, this string of appearances came after he assisted in first game of the season against Paraná and would go on to score three goals in the next four games. He would go on to make 125 appearances, scoring nine times for the club.

In February 2022, Andrey signed a two-year contract with Coritiba, making 21 appearances before suffering a torn knee ligament in May during a training session, which kept him out for the rest of the year.

International Career
Andrey made his U-17 debut for Brazil in November 2014, scoring against Australia in a friendly. He played every game, scoring twice, as Brazil won the 2015 South American U-17 Championship. In the 2015 FIFA U-17 World Cup, Andrey played every group game before being suspended for the Round of 16 game against New Zealand after accumulating too many yellow cards. He returned for the quarter-final against Nigeria which Brazil lost 3–0.

Honours

Club
Vasco da Gama
Taça Guanabara : 2019

Coritiba
Campeonato Paranaense: 2022

International
Brazil U17
South American Under-17 Football Championship: 2015

References

1998 births
Living people
Brazil youth international footballers
Campeonato Brasileiro Série A players
Campeonato Brasileiro Série B players
CR Vasco da Gama players
Coritiba Foot Ball Club players
Association football midfielders
Footballers from Rio de Janeiro (city)
Brazilian footballers